Anthony Cerdan Celino (born April 29, 1972) is a Filipino-born priest of the Catholic Church who was appointed as auxiliary bishop for the Diocese of El Paso in 2023.

Biography
On June 9 1997, Celino was ordained to the priesthood. Pope Francis appointed Celino auxiliary bishop for the Diocese of El Paso on February 8, 2023.     On March 31, 2023, Celino is scheduled to be consecrated as a bishop.

See also

 Catholic Church hierarchy
 Catholic Church in the United States
 Historical list of the Catholic bishops of the United States
 List of Catholic bishops of the United States
 Lists of patriarchs, archbishops, and bishops

References

External links
Roman Catholic Diocese of El Paso Official Site

 

1972 births 
Living people
American Roman Catholic priests
Bishops appointed by Pope Francis